Broadway Centrum was a television studio complex located in the New Manila district of Quezon City at Aurora Boulevard cor. Broadway (formerly Doña Juana Rodriguez) Avenue, Quezon City. It is currently owned by the Empire East Land Holdings, a subsidiary of Megaworld Corporation. It was previously owned by GMA Network.

Since its opening, numerous television series have been broadcast live or taped at the facility, including many shows not broadcast on GMA Network. The complex houses two main studios – the Eastside and the Westside Theaters.

It is a former studio of the longest-running noontime show in the Philippines, Eat Bulaga!, which lasted for 23 years.

History

The complex was inaugurated to usher GMA Network's broadcast in stereovision. In 1987, it served as the live studio of variety shows Lunch Date, That's Entertainment, Vilma! and GMA Supershow. In 1995, GMA Network Inc. constructed the second studio within the Broadway Centrum by renovating the Eastside Theater & renamed as "TAPE Studio, GMA Broadway Studio" that can accommodate 400 studio audiences for its noontime show Eat Bulaga!.

Eat Bulaga era
The Eastside Studios of the Broadway Centrum was the main home of the longest-running noontime show when TAPE Inc. constructed this studio and had its first broadcast here on September 16, 1995. From January 1 to March 5, 2010, Eat Bulaga! temporarily used the Westside Studios while the TAPE Studios was being renovated at that time. Diz Iz It! was the last GMA show that used the Westside Studios of Broadway Centrum in 2010. In the same year, the Westside Studios of Broadway Centrum did not have its tenants anymore for GMA Network because some of the network's shows migrated to their very own GMA Network Studios, while TV5 leased and revived the Westside Studios with a new and bigger format. The site was owned by GMA Network and also shared with TV5. The Ryzza Mae Show was the last GMA show that used the Eastside Studios of the Broadway Centrum in 2013.

2010–2018
Both Studios of the Broadway Centrum were active during that time, the Westside being leased by TV5 and was used for TV shows of the TV5 Entertainment Group such as Face to Face, The Jose and Wally Show Starring Vic Sotto, P.O.5, Star Factor, Hey It's Saberdey! and Artista Academy and others, while the Eastside Studio was used by the longest-running variety show Eat Bulaga! and daily morning talk show The Ryzza Mae Show.

In 2012, the Empire East Land Holdings, a subsidiary of Megaworld Corporation bought the Broadway Centrum to develop a residential condominium and a lifestyle mall at the site of the studio.

In March 2014, TV5 ended its lease agreement at the Broadway Centrum, particularly at the Westside Studio as an alternate studio of the network as TV5 moved to TV5 Media Center in Reliance, Mandaluyong.

The Broadway Centrum became a landmark once again thanks to the popularity of the AlDub loveteam in Eat Bulaga's segment, Kalyeserye where some memorable moments were set at the Broadway.

Demise and fate
On December 7, 2018, the Broadway Centrum finally ended its long 31-year run as Eat Bulaga! broadcast its last episode there and, since December 8, 2018, has moved to their new state-of-the-art studio, the APT Studios, located in Cainta, Rizal, thus ending their 23-year tenure at the old studio. It is set to be demolished and redeveloped into a high-rise condominium and a mall complex which will be built by Empire East Land Holdings, the 1.7 hectare property's new owners.

Shows produced at Broadway Centrum
Below is a partial list of programs that have taped episodes at the studios.

Artista Academy (TV5, 2012)
Beh Bote Nga (GMA 7, 1999–2000)
Bitoys Adventures In Bilibkaba (GMA 7, 1998–2000)
Born to Be a Star (2016)
Bubble Gang (GMA 7, 1995–2000)
D.A.T.S. (GMA 7, 1997–1999)
Digital LG Quiz (GMA 7, 1999–2004)
Diz Iz It! (GMA 7, 2010)
Eat Bulaga! (GMA 7, 1995–2018)
Face to Face (TV5, 2010–2013)
GMA Supershow (GMA 7, 1987–1997)
GoBingo (GMA 7, 1996–1999)
Good Morning Showbiz (GMA 7, 1987–1991)
Guwapings Live! (GMA 7, 1992)
HAPPinas Happy Hour (TV5, 2016)
Happy Truck HAPPinas (TV5, 2016)
Hey It's Saberdey! (TV5, 2011–2012)
Jamming (GMA 7, 1999–2000)
Katok Mga Misis! (GMA 7, 1995–1997)
Killer Karaoke: Pinoy Naman (TV5, 2013–2014)
L.O.L: Laugh or Lose (TV5, 2010–2011)
Lunch Date (GMA 7, 1987–1993)
Martin After Dark (GMA 7, 1988–1993)
Move It! (TV5, 2015)
Mixed N.U.T.S.: Numerong Unong Terrific Show (GMA 7, 1994–1997)
Oooops With Wendell & Antonio (GMA 7, 1997–1998)
Partners Mel and Jay (GMA 7, 1996–1999)
P.O.5 (TV5, 2010–2011)
Rising Stars Philippines (TV5, 2015)
S-Files (GMA 7, 1998–2007)
Salo-Salo Together (SST) (GMA 7, 1993–1995)
Shades (GMA 7, 1987–1988)
Show & Tell (GMA 7, 1994–1995)
Showbiz Central (GMA 7, 2007–2012)
SOP (GMA 7, 1997–2000)
Star Factor (TV5, 2010)
StarStruck (GMA 7, 2003–2007;  2009–2010)
Sunday Funday (TV5, 2012)
Talentadong Pinoy (TV5, 2008–2013, 2014)
Tanghalan ng Kampeon (GMA 7, 1989–1994)
That's Entertainment (GMA 7, 1987–1996)
The 700 Club Asia (GMA 7, 1995–2000)
The Jose and Wally Show Starring Vic Sotto (TV5, 2011–2012)
The Ryzza Mae Show (2013–2015)
Tok! Tok! Tok! Isang Milyon Pasok! (GMA 7, 2007–2008)
Vilma! (GMA 7, 1987–1995)
Walang Tulugan with the Master Showman (GMA 7, 1997–2010)
What Went Wrong? (GMA 7, 2000–2001)
Who Wants to Be a Millionaire? (TV5, 2009–2015)

In popular culture
Broadway Centrum, for the following movies, was usually used for taping or shooting:

Sige Ihataw Mo (1994)
The movie is set in Westside Studios, where some of the pivotal scenes were shot.  It is also headlined by the Universal Motion Dancers.

Bakit Papa? (2002)
The movie was set in Eastside Studios, where the SexBomb Girls performed some of their dance numbers in the movie. The girl group portrayed secret agents disguised as dancers.

Jack Em Popoy: The Puliscredibles (2018)
One of the filming locations in the movie Jack Em Popoy: The Puliscredibles was in Broadway Centrum, wherein Coco Martin playing Jacinto Halimuyac represents Manila Police District in the fictional Eat Bulaga! segment Mr. Popu: Poging Pulis. It is set in Eastside Studios and three of the EB! hosts, Allan K, Pauleen Luna-Sotto, and Luane Dy were present in the movie.

The movie, also an entry to the 2018 MMFF, was filmed before Eat Bulaga! transferred to APT Studios in Cainta, Rizal on December 8, 2018. When the movie was released, Eat Bulaga! is now broadcast in APT Studios.

References

Buildings and structures completed in 1987
1987 establishments in the Philippines
Television studios in the Philippines
Theaters and concert halls in Metro Manila
Eat Bulaga!
Buildings and structures in Quezon City